Taťjana Medvecká (born 10 November 1953) is a Czech actress. She starred in the film Operace Silver A under director Jiří Strach in 2007. Medvecká was named Best Supporting Actress at the 2011 Czech Lion Awards for her performance in The House. Medvecká won the equivalent award at Slovak cinema's Sun in a Net Awards a month later, for the same work.

References

External links
 
 Biography on csfd.cz

1953 births
Living people
Actresses from Prague
Czech film actresses
Czech stage actresses
Czech television actresses
Sun in a Net Awards winners
Academy of Performing Arts in Prague alumni
Czech voice actresses
20th-century Czech actresses
21st-century Czech actresses
Recipients of the Thalia Award